The 2012–13 Football League 2 was the 30th season since the official establishment of the third tier of Greek football in 1983. It is scheduled to start on 21 October 2012.
25 teams are separated into two groups, 13 in Group 1 (South) and 12 in Group 2 (North) according to geographical criteria.

Southern Group

Teams

Standings

Results

Top scorers

Updated to games played on 6 January 2013.

Northern Group

Teams

Standings

Results

Top scorers

Updated to games played on 6 January 2013.

References

Third level Greek football league seasons
3
Greece